Silver Gate is an unincorporated community and census-designated place (CDP) in Park County, Montana, United States. As of the 2010 census, it had a population of 20. Prior to 2010, it was part of the Cooke City-Silver Gate CDP.

The community sits northeast of Yellowstone National Park on the Beartooth Highway (U.S. Route 212). It is the closest community to the park's Northeast Entrance Station.

Geography
Silver Gate is in the southeast part of Park County, bordered to the south by the North Absaroka Wilderness within Shoshone National Forest in the state of Wyoming, to the west by Yellowstone National Park, and to the east by Cooke City. The two towns sit in the valley of Soda Butte Creek, which flows southwest into Wyoming to join the Lamar River within Yellowstone Park. The valley is part of the Yellowstone River watershed.

Demographics

References 

Census-designated places in Park County, Montana
Census-designated places in Montana